Metrophanes of Constantinople may refer to:

Metrophanes of Byzantium, bishop from 306 to 314
Patriarch Metrophanes II of Constantinople, reigned from 1440 to 1443
Patriarch Metrophanes III of Constantinople, reigned from 1565 to 1572 and from 1579 to 1580